Now That's What I Call the 00s is a special edition of the (UK) Now! series, released on 15 February 2010. The three-CD set has 60 hits from the 2000s. This compilation is notable as it features Madonna who is well known for not allowing her songs to be licensed on Now! compilations. Her music is conspicuously missing from all volumes of the regular Now That's What I Call Music! series (apart from her duet with Britney Spears). The only  other Now! appearances by Madonna in the Now canon is on both, Now That's What I Call 30 Years (2013) and Now That's What I Call Legends (2014),  where "Into The Groove" is included.

Track listing

CD 1
The Black Eyed Peas : "I Gotta Feeling"
Lady Gaga : "Poker Face"
Katy Perry : "I Kissed a Girl"
Take That : "Shine"
JLS : "Beat Again"
Duffy : "Mercy"
Lily Allen : "The Fear"
MIKA : Grace Kelly"
Girls Aloud : "The Promise"
Sugababes : "About You Now"
Pink : "So What"
Kaiser Chiefs : "Ruby"
Coldplay : "Viva la Vida"
Sam Sparro : "Black and Gold"
David Guetta featuring Kelly Rowland : "When Love Takes Over"
Rihanna featuring Jay-Z : "Umbrella"
Cheryl Cole : "Fight for This Love"
The Fray : "How to Save a Life"
Plain White T's : "Hey There Delilah"
Razorlight : "America"

CD 2
Madonna : "Hung Up"
Amy Winehouse : "Rehab"
Gnarls Barkley : "Crazy"
Gorillaz : "Dare"
Franz Ferdinand : "Take Me Out"
The Killers : "Mr. Brightside"
Nelly Furtado : "Maneater"
Shakira featuring Wyclef Jean : "Hips Don't Lie"
Justin Timberlake : "SexyBack"
The Pussycat Dolls featuring Busta Rhymes : "Don't Cha"
Kelis : "Milkshake"
Oasis : "The Importance of Being Idle"
Orson : "No Tomorrow"
Stereophonics  : "Dakota"
The Fratellis : "Chelsea Dagger"
Tony Christie : "(Is This the Way To) Amarillo"
Elton John : "Are You Ready for Love"
Corinne Bailey Rae : "Put Your Records On"
James Blunt : "You're Beautiful"
Westlife : "You Raise Me Up"

CD 3
OutKast: "Hey Ya!"
Robbie Williams: "Rock DJ"
Kylie Minogue: "Can't Get You Out of My Head"
S Club 7: "Don't Stop Movin'"
Britney Spears: "Oops!... I Did It Again"
Liberty X: "Just a Little"
Atomic Kitten: "Whole Again"
Daniel Bedingfield: "If You're Not the One"
Blue featuring Elton John: "Sorry Seems to Be the Hardest Word"
Will Young: "Leave Right Now"
Ronan Keating: "Life Is a Rollercoaster"
t.A.T.u.: "All the Things She Said"
3 of a Kind: "Baby Cakes"
McFly: "5 Colours in Her Hair"
Busted: "Crashed the Wedding"
Melanie C: "I Turn to You"
Fragma: "Toca's Miracle"
The Shapeshifters: "Lola's Theme"
Spiller featuring Sophie Ellis-Bextor: "Groovejet (If This Ain't Love)"
Room 5 featuring Oliver Cheatham: "Make Luv"

References

External links
 Now That's What I Call the 00's Track List

2010 compilation albums
2000s
EMI Records compilation albums
Virgin Records compilation albums
Universal Music Group compilation albums